Point Loma High School is a public high school in the San Diego Unified School District in San Diego, California, United States. It is located in the Loma Portal neighborhood of Point Loma. The school serves the neighborhoods of Point Loma and Ocean Beach. Students who live in Mission Hills may choose to attend Point Loma High School as their neighborhood school. Point Loma is accredited by the Western Association of Schools and Colleges (WASC).

History
PLHS is the third oldest high school in the San Diego Unified School District. It was dedicated in 1925 as Point Loma Junior-Senior High school, serving grades 7 through 12. There were 386 students at its opening on September 22, 1925. The first principal was Pete Ross and there were 30 teachers. Some San Diegans opposed creating a school in Point Loma, contending it was too far away from town, but school board member Edgar F. Hastings pushed the proposal through. In its early days the school was sometimes referred to as "Hastings' folly". The original three-story high school building was torn down in the 1970s as part of a statewide requirement to make all schools earthquake-safe. It was replaced by multiple two-story buildings. During the 1950s it was converted to a three-year high school with the opening of Richard Henry Dana Junior High School. In 1983 it became a four-year high school. PLHS now draws from six elementary schools serving grades kindergarten through 4, and two middle schools: Dana Middle for grades 5 and 6, and Correia Middle for grades 7 and 8.

The school holds the distinction of having produced two major-league baseball pitchers who threw perfect games - David Wells and Don Larsen. Only 21 pitchers have thrown perfect games in Major League Baseball history. Wells also threw a perfect game while a student at PLHS. Wells became the school's head baseball coach starting with the 2014-2015 school year. He had been volunteering as an assistant coach for several years. The team's home field was named David Wells Field in 2010.

Demographics
Point Loma High School is the third largest of 16 high schools in the San Diego Unified School District. It is a four-year, comprehensive high school, serving grades 9–12.  It houses a student population of approximately 2000 students who come primarily from the local community. Approximately 35 percent of the student body participates in specialized programs, such as the Voluntary Ethnic Enrollment Program (VEEP), the Choice Program, the Navy Junior Reserve Officers Training Corps (NJROTC) program, or the Seminar Program.

Academics
Point Loma High School offers a large variety of Advanced Placement classes, ranging from Music Theory to Physics. Video production is a class offered by Point Loma High that is uncommonly offered in high school, PLHS features a multimillion dollar video production suite unmatched by any other high school in San Diego County.

Athletics
The school's colors are maroon and gold, although football uniform colors are typically unconforming with their traditional colors of a main maroon with an accent of gold. The mascot is the Pointer Dog. The school offers a variety of men's and women's competitive sports:

Offered

Fall
Cross country (men and women)
Field hockey (women)
Football (men)
Golf (women)
Marching band (all genders)
Tennis (women)
Volleyball (women)
Water polo (men)

Winter
Basketball (men and women)
Soccer (men and women)
Water polo (women)
Wrestling (men and women)

Spring
Badminton (men and women)
Baseball (men)
Competitive cheer (men and women)
Golf (men)
Lacrosse (men and women)
Softball (women)
Swim (men and women)
Tennis (men)
Track & field (men and women)
Volleyball (men)

Club Sports
Surfing (men and women)
Sailing (men and women)

Awards and championships

Football
The Pointer football team won CIF championships four times, in 1966, 1982, 1987 and 1991, all during the tenure of football head coach Bennie Edens.

Women's basketball
The Lady Pointers basketball team was a powerhouse at the state level during the late 1980s, capturing the state championship for four straight years, 1984 to 1987. Their victories inspired a graffiti-style mural at the athletic field. Under legendary women's basketball coach Lee Trepanier, known as "Coach T", the Lady Pointers posted an astonishing record of 335 wins and 51 losses between 1977 and 1990.

Sailing
The nationally ranked PLHS sailing team has won the Baker Trophy, the national team-racing championship of the Interscholastic Sailing Association, sixteen times (2003, 2004, 2005, 2010, 2012, 2013, 2014, and 2018), making them the national champions in the sport of sailing.  PLHS sailing teams also won the Mallory trophy, the national fleet-racing championship, eight times (1993, 2003, 2004, 2005, 2012, 2014, 2017, and 2018), a record unmatched by any other school. In 2003 PLHS Sailor Parker Shinn won the Cressy Trophy, the national singlehanded championship of the ISSA.

Leap of Faith
The school became known among skateboarders for an infamous drop called the "Leap of Faith". This was a drop of 14 feet, 3 inches, consisting of 27 stairs, that had to be approached by an ollie over a railing. Professional skateboarder Jamie Thomas made this spot famous in his filmed attempt to land it; he landed without injury, but his board snapped upon impact. His attempt was included in the Zero video "Thrill Of It All". Another skateboarder, Richard King and several rollerbladers also attempted it, among them Ian Brown, Brian Shima, and Chris Haffey, but no one was successful at landing it completely, and several people broke their legs or ankles in the attempt. The PLHS Leap of Faith was included as part of Tony Hawk's Pro Skater 2 and in a bonus level in Tony Hawk's Underground, the skateboarding-based video games. In 2005, the school built an elevator at the site to close it off to skateboarders.

The Gotta Sing, Gotta Dance Company
English teacher Larry Zeiger taught a class in musical theater called “Contemporary voices in literature” from 1977 until his retirement in 2007. In the second semester the students became “The Gotta Sing Gotta Dance Company”, writing and performing an original musical show in which all 100+ students took part. The students were all seniors, and “Zeiger’s show” became a beloved senior-year school tradition during the 31 years of its existence. The 2003 production "Sticky Fingers: A Tale of Saks, Lies and Videotape", which was inspired by the :Winona Ryder shoplifting incident, received national attention. The Performing Arts Center on campus was renamed the "Larry Zeiger Performing Arts Center" in 2007.

Notable alumni
 Jamal Agnew, NFL wide receiver for The Jacksonville Jaguars
 Eric Allen, six-time NFL Pro Bowler; Philadelphia Eagles, New Orleans Saints, Oakland Raiders; ESPN analyst
 Margaret Avery, actress, nominated for an Academy Award, The Color Purple
 John Balaz, Major League Baseball player
 Todd Benjamin, CNN business reporter
 Graham Biehl, 2008 and 2012 Olympian in men's 470 sailboat
 Malin Burnham, American sailor, philanthropist, and businessman
 Florence Chadwick, swimmer, first woman to swim English Channel in both directions
 Bill Cleator, former San Diego City Councilmember, District 2
 Dennis Conner, sailor, four-time winner of America's Cup
 Randy Gardner (record holder), holder of world record for longest time a human has gone without sleep
 La'Roi Glover, NFL defensive tackle, St Louis Rams, Oakland Raiders, New Orleans Saints
 Sandra Good, Manson Family member
 Justin Halpern, writer
 Waad Hirmez, six-time pro soccer champion with San Diego Sockers; 1981 CIF player of the year
 Ben Hueso, state legislator
 Joe Hutshing, Academy Award-winning film editor
 Don Larsen, Major League Baseball pitcher, pitched only perfect game in World Series (1956)
 Bill Lowery, former Congressman
 Dorian "Doc" Paskowitz (1921–2014), surfer and physician
 Briana Provancha, Olympic sailor in 2016
 Mark Reynolds, four-time Olympian in sailing with two gold medals and one silver; two-time Star World champion
 Marion Ross, actress, Happy Days
 Jason Scheff, member of rock band Chicago
 Suzy Spafford, creator of Suzy's Zoo line of greeting cards, calendars and cartoons
 JJ Stokes, NFL wide receiver, San Francisco 49ers, New England Patriots, Jacksonville Jaguars
 Wavves musician Nathan Williams
 David Wells, Major League Baseball pitcher, pitched perfect game in 1998
 Dan White, football player, quarterback for 1994 Fiesta Bowl champion Arizona
 Jimmy Wilson, defensive back, Miami Dolphins
 Aaron Zigman, songwriter and Hollywood film score composer
 Marty Smith. professional motorcross racer

See also
Primary and secondary schools in San Diego, California
List of high schools in San Diego County, California

References

External links
 Point Loma High School website

High schools in San Diego
Point Loma High School alumni
Point Loma, San Diego
Public high schools in California
Educational institutions established in 1925
1925 establishments in California